The 1936–37 English National League season was the second season of the English National League, the top level ice hockey league in England. 11 teams participated in the league, and the Wembley Lions won the championship.

Regular season

External links
 Season on hockeydb.com

Eng
Engl
Engl
English National League seasons
1936–37 in British ice hockey